Sotho–Tswana languages are a group of closely related Bantu languages spoken in Southern Africa. 
The Sotho–Tswana group corresponds to the S.30 label in Guthrie's 1967–71 classification of languages in the Bantu family.

The various dialects of Tswana, Southern Sotho and Northern Sotho are highly mutually intelligible. On more than one occasion, proposals have been put forward to create a unified standardisation and declare a Sotho–Tswana language.

Languages 

The group is divided into three main branches, Tswana, Northern Sotho, and Southern Sotho as follows:
Tswanaic
Tswana (Setswana), with dialects: Fokeng, Hurutshe, Kgatla, Kwena, Lete, Ngwaketse, Ngwato, Rolong, Tawana, Tlhaping, Tlharo, Tlokwa
Kgalagadi, with dialects: Nuclear Kgalagadi (Kgalagadi proper), Balaongwe, Kenyi, Khakhae, Koma, Ngologa, Pedi, Phaleng, Rhiti, Shaga, Siwane
Southern Sotho
Sesotho-Lozi
Southern Sotho or Sotho (Sesotho): Phuthi, Taung
Northern Sotho (Sesotho sa Leboa)
Sepedic: includes Pedi and Tswapong:
Pedi: Sehananwa (GaMmalebogo-Makgababeng), Sekgaga (Greater Lebowakgomo),Sekhutswe, Sekopa, Masemola (GaMasemola), Sekone (GaMatlala-Moletši), Sepai, Phalaborwa, (Mashishing-Bushbuckridge), Setlokwa (Botlokwa and GaManthata), Tšhwene (GaTšhwene)
Tswapong
Birwa
Lovedu (Lobedu, Khelobedu, or KhiLovedu)
Sepulana/Sepulane
Lozi (Silozi or Rozi)

Northern Sotho, which appears largely to be a taxonomic holding category for what is Sotho-Tswana but neither identifiably Southern Sotho nor Tswana, subsumes highly varied dialects including Pedi (Sepedi), Tswapo (Setswapo), Lovedu (Khilobedu), Pai and Pulana. Maho (2002) leaves the "East Sotho" varieties of Kutswe, Pai, and Pulana unclassified within Sotho-Tswana.

Lozi is spoken in Zambia and north-eastern Namibia (in the Caprivi). It is distinct from the other Sotho-Tswana languages due to heavy linguistic influences from Luyaana, and possibly other Zambian and Caprivi languages. In the Guthrie work – as is now widely acknowledged – Lozi was misclassified as K.21.

Sample

The Lord's Prayer in the various Sotho-Tswana languages.

English: Our Father in heaven, hallowed be your name, your kingdom come, your will be done, on earth as it is in heaven.

Northern Sotho: 
Sotho: 
Tswana: 
Lozi:

References 

 
Languages of Botswana
Languages of Lesotho
Languages of South Africa